Attorney General Carr may refer to:

Christopher M. Carr (born 1972), Attorney General of Georgia
Waggoner Carr (1918–2004), Attorney General of Texas

See also
William Ogle Carr (1802–1856), King's Advocate of Ceylon, predecessor office to the Attorney General of Sri Lanka
General Carr (disambiguation)